Seán Harrington (1915–1978) was an Irish republican who later became Chief of Staff of the Irish Republican Army.

Biography
Harrington was born in Ballyduff, County Kerry in 1915. He joined the Irish Republican Army (IRA) as a young man.

By 1941, Harrington was a member of the IRA's Army Council which organised a court-marshal of former Chief of Staff Stephen Hayes, although he did not personally take part in the trial.  He became Chief of Staff of the IRA in November 1941 when Pearse Kelly was arrested, but he himself was arrested the following month.  He was charged with failing to explain his possession of £50 and refusing to give his details to police, and w was sentenced in March 1942 to two years imprisonment.  Despite this, he appears to have remained Chief of Staff until February 1942, when Seán McCool was selected as his replacement.

He later lived at Kennelsfort Road, Palmerstown, Dublin, and died in November 1978.

References

1915 births
1978 deaths
Irish Republican Army (1922–1969) members
People from County Kerry